The Agusta A.105 was an Italian rotorcraft designed by Agusta. It was never developed beyond the prototype stage.

Development and design
The A.105 was designed to simplify the manufacturing process. Built to be a liaison, aerial photography and high-speed transport helicopter, it was powered by the Agusta built Turbomeca-Agusta TA-230 turbine engine.

The A.105 and A.105B were displayed at the 1965 Paris Air Show, the latter wearing Italian Air Force markings. Both variants did not progress beyond the prototype stage.

Variants
A.105
Original two-seat prototype
A.105B
Four seater variant.

Operators

 Italian Air Force

Specifications (A.105)

See also

References

 

A.105
1960s Italian helicopters
1960s Italian civil utility aircraft
Aircraft first flown in 1964